Sara Anderson Immerwahr (August 28, 1914 in Royersford, Pennsylvania – June 25, 2008 in Chapel Hill, North Carolina) was an American Classical archaeologist.

Life
Immerwahr earned her bachelor's degree from Mount Holyoke College in 1935. One of her tutors at Mount Holyoke was archaeologist Caroline Morris Galt. She gained her Ph.D. from Bryn Mawr College in 1943 with a dissertation entitled "The Mycenaean Pictorial Style of Vase Painting in the Thirteenth Century B.C."

She was married to Henry Rudolph Immerwahr from 1944 until her death. She served as faculty member in both classics and art history at the University of North Carolina at Chapel Hill.

In 2021 the American School of Classical Studies at Athens named a suite after her and her husband.

Scholarship
 1990. Aegean painting in the Bronze Age. University Park: Pennsylvania State University Press.
 2004. Sara Anderson Immerwahr and Anne Proctor Chapin. Charis: essays in honor of Sara A. Immerwahr. Princeton NJ: American School of Classical Studies at Athens.

Students
1972. Gesell, Geraldine C. The Archaeological Evidence for the Minoan House Cult and its Survival in Iron Age Crete. Ph.D., Department of Classics, University of North Carolina at Chapel Hill.
1974. Cross, Toni Marie. Bronze Tripods and Related Stands in the Eastern Mediterranean from the Twelfth Through Seventh Centuries BC. Ph.D., Department of Classics, University of North Carolina at Chapel Hill.
1975. Mattusch, Carol C. Casting Techniques of Greek Bronze Sculpture: Foundries and Foundry Remains from the Athenian Agora with Reference to Other Ancient Sources. Ph.D., Department of Classics, University of North Carolina at Chapel Hill.
1981. Haskell, Halford W. The Coarse Ware Stirrup Jars of Crete and the Cyclades. Ph.D., Department of Classics, University of North Carolina at Chapel Hill.
1981. Sutton, Robert F. The Interaction Between Men and Women Portrayed on Attic Red-figure Pottery. Ph.D., Department of Classics, University of North Carolina at Chapel Hill.

References

External links

1914 births
2008 deaths
Classical archaeologists
Bryn Mawr College alumni
Classical scholars of the University of North Carolina at Chapel Hill
Mount Holyoke College alumni
Women classical scholars
American classical scholars
American women archaeologists
Academics from Pennsylvania
20th-century American women
21st-century American women